The Girl Chewing Gum is a 1976 British short film directed by John Smith. The film is widely acknowledged as one of the most important avant-garde films of the 20th century.

The film was inspired by a scene in François Truffaut's 1973 film Day for Night in which the director gives instructions to the actors, and even tells a dog to urinate on a lamppost.

The Girl Chewing Gum was preserved by the Academy Film Archive in 2019.

Plot summary 
At Stamford Road in Dalston Junction of east London, the camera follows pedestrians, cars and birds while a narrator, who appears to be the director behind the camera, seems to direct their actions.

Similar works 
1973: The French film Day for Night by François Truffaut
2011: The 2 min 28 sec Swedish short film Fågel däruppe by Mårten Nilsson

References

External links 
 Essay on 'The Girl Chewing Gum' by Erika Balsom on Tate website

1976 films
British avant-garde and experimental films
1976 short films
British black-and-white films
British short films
1970s English-language films
1970s avant-garde and experimental films
1970s British films